Thuidium is a genus of moss in the family Thuidiaceae. The name comes from the genus Thuja and the Latin suffix -idium, meaning diminutive. This is due to its resemblance to small cedar trees.

Description 
Members of the genus are characterized by creeping, highly branched, pinnate leaves.

There are approximately 230 species found distributed in North America, Mexico, West Indies, Central America, South America, Europe, and Asia.

Species
Species adapted from The Plant List;

Thuidium abietinum 
Thuidium aciculum 
Thuidium aculeoserratum 
Thuidium algarvicum 
Thuidium allenii 
Thuidium alvarezianum 
Thuidium amblyostomum 
Thuidium angustifolium 
Thuidium arzobispoae 
Thuidium assimile 
Thuidium assurgens 
Thuidium atlanticum 
Thuidium attenuatum 
Thuidium austro-serpens 
Thuidium bifarium 
Thuidium blandowii 
Thuidium blepharophyllum 
Thuidium bolanderi 
Thuidium bonianum 
Thuidium brachymenium 
Thuidium brachypyxis 
Thuidium brachythecium 
Thuidium brandisii 
Thuidium brasiliense 
Thuidium breviacuminatum 
Thuidium brevirameum 
Thuidium calyptratum 
Thuidium campanulatum 
Thuidium campbellianum 
Thuidium capillatum 
Thuidium carantae 
Thuidium cardotii 
Thuidium catenulatum 
Thuidium chacoanum 
Thuidium chenagonii 
Thuidium chilense 
Thuidium chloropsis 
Thuidium ciliatum 
Thuidium contortulum 
Thuidium costaricense 
Thuidium crispifolium 
Thuidium cylindraceum 
Thuidium cylindrella 
Thuidium cymbifoliolum 
Thuidium cymbifolium 
Thuidium decurvatum 
Thuidium delicatulum 
Thuidium denticulosum 
Thuidium diaphanum 
Thuidium dimorphum 
Thuidium djuriense 
Thuidium dusenii 
Thuidium eccremocarpum 
Thuidium erosifolium 
Thuidium espinosae 
Thuidium exilissimum 
Thuidium fallax 
Thuidium faulense 
Thuidium ferricola 
Thuidium filicinum 
Thuidium frontinoae 
Thuidium fuciforme 
Thuidium fujisanum 
Thuidium fulvastrum 
Thuidium furfurosum 
Thuidium fuscatum 
Thuidium giraldii 
Thuidium glaucinum 
Thuidium granulatum 
Thuidium gratum 
Thuidium guatemalense 
Thuidium hookeri 
Thuidium hygrophilum 
Thuidium hystricosum 
Thuidium inconspicuum 
Thuidium intermedium 
Thuidium intricatum 
Thuidium investe 
Thuidium involvens 
Thuidium jacquemontii 
Thuidium kanedae 
Thuidium kiasense 
Thuidium kuripanum 
Thuidium laevipes 
Thuidium laeviusculum 
Thuidium lasiomitrium 
Thuidium laterculi 
Thuidium latifolium 
Thuidium laxifolium 
Thuidium leptocladum 
Thuidium ligulifolium 
Thuidium longinerve 
Thuidium loricalycinum 
Thuidium ludoviciae 
Thuidium mascarenicum 
Thuidium mattogrossense 
Thuidium meyenianum 
Thuidium minusculum 
Thuidium mittenii 
Thuidium molkenboeri 
Thuidium molluscum 
Thuidium muricatulum 
Thuidium muricola 
Thuidium nabambissense 
Thuidium nanodelicatulum 
Thuidium nigerianum 
Thuidium obscuriusculum 
Thuidium occultirete 
Thuidium occultissimum 
Thuidium ochraceum 
Thuidium oeningense 
Thuidium papillosum 
Thuidium paraguense 
Thuidium patrum 
Thuidium pauperum 
Thuidium pellucinerve 
Thuidium perscissum 
Thuidium persistens 
Thuidium peruvianum 
Thuidium pinnatulum 
Thuidium plumulosiforme 
Thuidium plumulosum 
Thuidium poeppigii 
Thuidium pristocalyx 
Thuidium promontorii 
Thuidium pseudoaequatoriale 
Thuidium pseudodelicatulum 
Thuidium pseudoglaucinum 
Thuidium pseudoinvolvens 
Thuidium pseudoprotensum 
Thuidium pseudorecognitum 
Thuidium pseudotamarisci 
Thuidium pulvinatulum 
Thuidium punctulatum 
Thuidium purpureum 
Thuidium pycnothallum 
Thuidium quadrifarium 
Thuidium ramentosum 
Thuidium ramosissimum 
Thuidium ramuligerum 
Thuidium ramulosum 
Thuidium ramusculosum 
Thuidium raphidostegum 
Thuidium recognitum 
Thuidium remotifolium 
Thuidium robbinsii 
Thuidium rubicundulum 
Thuidium sachalinense 
Thuidium samoanum 
Thuidium scabrosulum 
Thuidium schiedeanum 
Thuidium schistocalyx 
Thuidium scitum 
Thuidium scopulum 
Thuidium semitortulum 
Thuidium serricola 
Thuidium sharpii 
Thuidium sigmatella 
Thuidium siphotheca 
Thuidium sparsifolium 
Thuidium sparsum 
Thuidium stellatifolium 
Thuidium stuartii 
Thuidium subdelicatulum 
Thuidium suberectum 
Thuidium subfalcatum 
Thuidium subglaucinum 
Thuidium subgracile 
Thuidium subgranulatum 
Thuidium submicropteris 
Thuidium subpinnatum 
Thuidium subtamariscinum 
Thuidium subulaceum 
Thuidium synoicum 
Thuidium tamariscellum 
Thuidium tamariscinum 
Thuidium thamniopsis 
Thuidium thermophilum 
Thuidium tomentosum 
Thuidium torrentium 
Thuidium trachypodum 
Thuidium transvaaliense 
Thuidium tripinnatum 
Thuidium unguiculatum 
Thuidium unipinnatum 
Thuidium urceolatum 
Thuidium varians 
Thuidium velatum 
Thuidium ventrifolium 
Thuidium versicolor 
Thuidium virginianum 
Thuidium watanabei 
Thuidium whippleanum 
Thuidium yungarum

References

Hypnales
Moss genera